Hemicrambe townsendii is a rare cliff-dwelling shrub in the family Brassicaceae. Less than one metre tall, it can easily be identified by its white flowers and small hanging fruit. It has a very limited range, only being found in Yemen. It is currently unknown whether the overall population is growing or shrinking.

References

townsendii
Endemic flora of Socotra
Vulnerable plants
Taxonomy articles created by Polbot